Yeroor is a village situated near Anchal, Kollam district, Kerala, India.

Politics

Yeroor is a part of Punalur assembly constituency in Kollam (Lok Sabha constituency). Shri. P S SUPAL is the current MLA of Punalur. Shri.N. K. Premachandran is the current member of parliament of Kollam.

References

Geography of Kollam district
Villages in Kollam district